Nanocuris is an extinct genus of Deltatheridiidae from the Cretaceous of Canada (Saskatchewan) and United States (Wyoming - Lance Formation). Initially, it was classified in a proper family, Nanocuridae, in the clade Eutheria, but a reanalysis of a new specimen revealed a delthatheroid affinity of the genus.

References

Prehistoric metatherians
Cretaceous mammals
Cretaceous mammals of North America
Fossil taxa described in 2007
Hell Creek fauna
Prehistoric mammal genera